In electronics, a subtractor – a digital circuit that performs subtraction of numbers – can be designed using the same approach as that of an adder. The binary subtraction process is summarized below. As with an adder, in the general case of calculations on multi-bit numbers, three bits are involved in performing the subtraction for each bit of the difference: the minuend, subtrahend, and a borrow in from the previous (less significant) bit order position. The outputs are the difference bit and borrow bit . The subtractor is best understood by considering that the subtrahend and both borrow bits have negative weights, whereas the X and D bits are positive. The operation performed by the subtractor is to rewrite  (which can take the values -2, -1, 0, or 1) as the sum .

Subtractors are usually implemented within a binary adder for only a small cost when using the standard two's complement notation, by providing an addition/subtraction selector to the carry-in and to invert the second operand.

 (definition of two's complement notation)

Half subtractor

The half subtractor is a combinational circuit which is used to perform subtraction of two bits. It has two inputs, the minuend  and subtrahend  and two outputs the difference  and borrow out . The borrow out signal is set when the subtractor needs to borrow from the next digit in a multi-digit subtraction. That is,  when . An important point worth mentioning is that the half subtractor diagram aside implements  and not  since  on the diagram is given by
.
This is an important distinction to make since subtraction itself is not commutative, but the difference bit  is calculated using an XOR gate which is commutative.

The truth table for the half subtractor is:

.

Consequently, a simplified half-subtract circuit, advantageously avoiding crossed traces in particular as well as a negate gate is:
      X ── XOR ─┬─────── |X-Y|,  is 0 if X equals Y, 1 otherwise
         ┌──┘   └──┐  
      Y ─┴─────── AND ── borrow, is 1 if Y > X, 0 otherwise 
where lines to the right are outputs and others (from the top, bottom or left) are inputs.

Full subtractor
Or in symbols: . Like the half subtractor, the full subtractor generates a borrow out when it needs to borrow from the next digit. When a borrow out is generated, 2 is added in the current digit. (This is similar to the subtraction algorithm in decimal. Instead of adding 2, we add 10 when we borrow.) Therefore, .

The truth table for the full subtractor is:

Therefore the equation is:

See also
 Adder (electronics)
 Carry-lookahead adder
 Carry-save adder
 Adding machine
 Adder-subtractor

References

 Foundations Of Digital Electronics by Elijah Mwangi

External links 
 N bit Binary addition or subtraction using single circuit.

Digital circuits
Arithmetic logic circuits
4
Subtraction
Binary arithmetic